Robert C. Dorn was an American politician from New York. In 1868, he was the second person tried by the New York Court for the Trial of Impeachments.

Life
He lived in Schenectady, New York.

In January 1856, he was appointed Superintendent of Canal Repairs for Section 2 of the Erie Canal, and then also for Sections 1, 3, 4 and 5 until the end of 1864, and continued with Sections 1, 2 and 3 in 1865.

He was a Canal Commissioner from 1866 to 1868, elected in 1865 on the Republican ticket.

In 1868, he was impeached by an unanimous vote of the New York State Assembly. The First Article charged him with "complicity in a combination made by contractors." Article Two charged him with "letting a contract to the highest instead of the lowest bidder." Article Four charged him with "letting contracts without advertising some." The trial before the Court of Impeachments opened on May 26 at Albany. On June 12, he was acquitted with a vote of 8 for conviction, among them Martin Grover, Theodore Miller, and 19 against, among them Ward Hunt, Lewis B. Woodruff, Charles Mason and William J. Bacon.

Sources
STATE AFFAIRS.; ...Canal Appointments in NYT on January 23, 1856
Annual Report of the Canal Commissioners for 1865 (1866)
The Impeachment or Canal Commissioner Dorn in NYT on May 26, 1868
NEW-YORK.; The Impeachment of Canal Commissioner R. C. Dorn - Organization of the Court in NYT on May 27, 1868
The Dorn Impeachment Trial at Albany in NYT on June 13, 1868

Year of birth missing
Year of death missing
Politicians from Schenectady, New York
Erie Canal Commissioners
United States officials impeached by state or territorial governments